Pauline Ibeagha (born 13 May 1978) is a retired Nigerian sprinter.

Her career peaking in 2002, she competed at the 2002 Commonwealth Games, reaching the semi-final of the 100 and 200 metres and finishing fifth in the 4 × 100 metres relay. At the 2002 African Championships the Nigerian team did not finish the 4 × 100 metres relay, but won silver in the 4 × 400 metres relay. Ibeagha later reached the 200 metres semi-final at the 2004 African Championships.

Her personal best times were 11.38 seconds in the 100 metres, achieved in March 2002 in Enugu; and 23.99 seconds in the 200 metres, achieved at the 2002 Commonwealth Games in Manchester.

References 

1978 births
Living people
Nigerian female sprinters
Athletes (track and field) at the 2002 Commonwealth Games
Commonwealth Games competitors for Nigeria
20th-century Nigerian women
21st-century Nigerian women